The Time Machine is a 2002 American post-apocalyptic science fiction film loosely adapted by John Logan from the 1895 novel of the same name by H. G. Wells and the screenplay of the 1960 film of the same name by David Duncan. Arnold Leibovit served as executive producer and Simon Wells, the great-grandson of the original author, served as director. The film stars Guy Pearce, Orlando Jones, Samantha Mumba, Mark Addy, and Jeremy Irons, and includes a cameo by Alan Young, who also appeared in the 1960 film adaptation. The film is set in New York City instead of London, and contains new story elements not present in the original novel nor the 1960 film adaptation, including a romantic backstory, a new scenario about how civilization was destroyed, and several new characters such as an artificially intelligent hologram and a Morlock leader.

The film received negative reviews from critics and grossed $123 million worldwide. It was nominated for the Academy Award for Best Makeup (John M. Elliot Jr. and Barbara Lorenz) at the 75th Academy Awards, but lost to Frida.

Plot

In 1899, Dr. Alexander Hartdegen is an inventor teaching at Columbia University in New York City. Unlike his friend David Philby, Alexander would rather do pure research than work in the world of business. After a mugger kills his fiancée Emma, he devotes himself to building a time machine that will allow him to travel back in time to save her. When he completes the machine four years later, he travels back to 1899 and prevents her murder, only to see her killed again when a horseless carriage frightens the horses of a horse-drawn vehicle.

Alexander realizes that any attempt to save Emma will result in her death through other circumstances. He travels to 2030 to discover whether science has been able to solve his question of how to change the past. At the New York Public Library, a holographic librarian called Vox 114 insists time travel to the past is impossible. Alexander travels to 2037, when the accidental destruction of the Moon by lunar colonists has begun rendering the Earth virtually uninhabitable. While restarting the time machine to avoid debris, he is knocked unconscious and travels forward to the date 16 July 802701 before reawakening.

The human race has reverted to a primitive lifestyle and the Earth has healed. Some survivors, called "Eloi", live on the sides of cliffs of what was once Manhattan. Alexander is nursed back to health by a virtuous young woman named Mara, one of the few Eloi who speak English. He observes the broken moon and realises that maybe his teachings led to this future. One night, Alexander and Mara's younger brother, Kalen, dream of a frightening, jagged-toothed face and a creature calling their name. Alexander informs Mara of the dream and she tells him they all have that dream, and she notices that his watch is missing. The next day, the Eloi are attacked and Mara is dragged underground by ape-like monsters. The creatures are called "Morlocks" and they hunt the Eloi for food. In order to rescue Mara, Kalen leads Alexander to Vox 114, which is still functional after 800,000 years.

After learning from Vox how to find the Morlocks, Alexander enters their underground lair through an opening that resembles the face in his nightmare. He is captured and thrown into an area where Mara sits in a cage. Alexander meets an intelligent, humanoid Über-Morlock, who explains that Morlocks are the evolutionary descendants of the humans who went underground after the Moon broke apart, while the Eloi are evolved from those who remained on the surface. The Über-Morlocks are a caste of telepaths who rule the other Morlocks, and use the Eloi as breeding vessels for their Morlock offspring.

The Über-Morlock explains that Alexander cannot alter Emma's fate; her death is what drove him to build the time machine in the first place, therefore saving her would be a virtual impossibility due to temporal paradox. The Über-Morlock shows Alexander and tells him to go home, having given him the answer he had been searching for. Alexander gets into the machine but pulls the Über-Morlock in with him, carrying them into the future as they fight. The Über-Morlock dies by rapidly aging when Alexander pushes him outside of the machine's temporal bubble. Alexander stops in 635,427,810, revealing a harsh, rust-colored sky over a wasteland of Morlock caves.

Accepting that he cannot save Emma, Alexander travels back to rescue Mara. After freeing her, he starts the time machine and jams its gears, creating a violent distortion in time. Pursued by the Morlocks, Alexander and Mara escape to the surface as the time distortion explodes, killing the Morlocks and destroying their caves along with the time machine. Alexander begins a new life with Mara and the Eloi, while Vox 114 helps him educate them.

In 1903, Philby and Mrs. Watchit, Alexander's housekeeper, are in his laboratory discussing his absence. Philby tells Mrs. Watchit he is glad that Alexander has gone to a place where he can find peace, then tells her that he would like to hire her as a housekeeper, which she accepts until Alexander returns. Mrs. Watchit bids Alexander farewell and Philby leaves, looking toward the laboratory affectionately, then throws his bowler hat away in tribute to Alexander's objection to conformity.

Cast

 Guy Pearce as Dr. Alexander Hartdegen, associate professor of applied mechanics and engineering at Columbia University. In the novel, the time traveler's name isn't given.
 Samantha Mumba as Mara, a virtuous Eloi woman who befriends Alexander and eventually becomes his love interest.
 Orlando Jones as Vox 114, a holographic artificial intelligence librarian at the New York Public Library in the future, who befriends Alexander.
 Mark Addy as David Philby, Alexander's good friend and conservative colleague.
 Jeremy Irons as The Über-Morlock, the leader of the Morlocks and a member of the telepathic-ruling caste of the Morlock world.
 Sienna Guillory as Emma, Alexander's fiancée.
 Phyllida Law as Mrs. Watchit, Alexander's housekeeper in New York.
 Alan Young as Flower store worker
 Omero Mumba as Kalen, Mara's young brother.
 Yancey Arias as Toren
 Laura Kirk as Flower seller
 Josh Stamberg as Motorist
 Myndy Crist as Jogger
 Connie Ray as field trip teacher
 Peter Karika as The Trainer 
 John W. Momrow as Fifth Avenue carriage driver
 Max Baker as Mugger who kills Emma
 Jeffrey M. Meyer as Central Park carriage driver
 Raymond Hoffman as Central Park ice skater
 Richard Cetrone cameos as a Hunter Morlock. 
 Doug Jones cameos as a Spy Morlock.

Production
The film was a co-production of DreamWorks and Warner Bros. in association with Arnold Leibovit Entertainment who obtained the rights to the George Pal original Time Machine 1960 and collectively negotiated the deal that made it possible for both DreamWorks and Warner Bros. to make the film.

Director Gore Verbinski was brought in to take over the last 18 days of shooting, as Wells was suffering from "extreme exhaustion." Wells returned for post-production. Filming began in February 2001 and finished on May 29, 2001.

Special effects
The Morlocks were depicted using actors in costumes wearing animatronic masks created by Stan Winston Studio. For scenes in which they run on all fours faster than humanly possible, Industrial Light & Magic created CGI versions of the creatures.

Many of the time traveling scenes were entirely computer generated, including a 33-second shot in the workshop where the time machine is located. The camera pulls out, traveling through New York City and then into space, past the ISS, and ends with a space plane landing at the Moon to reveal Earth's future lunar colonies. Plants and buildings are shown springing up and then being replaced by new growth in a constant cycle. In later shots, the effects team used an erosion algorithm to digitally simulate the Earth's landscape changing through the centuries.

For some of the lighting effects used for the digital time bubble around the time machine, ILM developed an extended-range color format, which they named rgbe (red, green, blue, and an exponent channel) (See Paul E. Debevec and Jitendra Malik, "Recovering High Dynamic Range Radiance Maps from Photographs, Siggraph Proceedings, 1997).

The film's original release date was December 2001, but it was moved to March 2002 because they wanted to avoid competition with The Lord of the Rings: The Fellowship of the Ring and also a scene was removed from the Moon destruction sequence showing pieces of the Moon crashing into buildings in New York because it looked too similar visually to the September 11 attacks.

Soundtrack
A full score was written by Klaus Badelt, with the recognizable theme being the track "I Don't Belong Here", which was later used in the 2008 Discovery Channel Mini series When We Left Earth.

In 2002, the film's soundtrack won the World Soundtrack Award for Discovery of the Year.

Reception

Box office
The film grossed $22 million at #1 during the opening weekend of March 8–10, 2002. The film eventually earned $56 million in North America and $123 million worldwide.

Critical reaction
The film holds a 28% rating on Rotten Tomatoes based on 156 reviews with an average rating of 4.79/10. The site's critical consensus reads "This Machine has all the razzle-dazzles of modern special effects, but the movie takes a turn for the worst when it switches from a story about lost love to a confusing action-thriller." Metacritic assigned the film a weighted average score of 42 out of 100, based on 33 critics, indicating "mixed or average reviews". Audiences polled by CinemaScore gave the film an average grade of "C+" on an A+ to F scale.

William Arnold of the Seattle Post-Intelligencer, who was somewhat positive about the film, wrote that it lost some of the simplicity and charm of the 1960 George Pal film by adding characters such as Jeremy Irons' "über-morlock". He praised actor Guy Pearce's "more eccentric" time traveler and his transition from an awkward intellectual to a man of action. Victoria Alexander of Filmsinreview.com wrote that "The Time Machine is a loopy love story with good special effects but a storyline that's logically incomprehensible," noting some "plot holes" having to deal with Hartdegen and his machine's cause-and-effect relationship with the outcome of the future. Jay Carr of the Boston Globe wrote: "The truth is that Wells wasn't that penetrating a writer when it came to probing character or the human heart. His speculations and gimmicks were what propelled his books. The film, given the chance to deepen its source, instead falls back on its gadgets."

Some critics praised the special effects, declaring the film visually impressive and colorful, while others thought the effects were poor. Roger Ebert of the Chicago Sun-Times scorned the film, and found the Morlock animation cartoonish and unrealistic, because of their manner of leaping and running. Ebert notes the contrast in terms of the social/racial representation of the attractive Eloi between the two films, between the "dusky sun people" of this version and the Nordic race in the George Pal film. Aside from its vision of the future, the film's recreation of New York at the turn of the century won it some praise. Bruce Westbrook of the Houston Chronicle writes "The far future may be awesome to consider, but from period detail to matters of the heart, this film is most transporting when it stays put in the past."

References

External links

 
 
 
 
 
 
 

2002 films
2000s dystopian films
2002 science fiction action films
2000s science fiction adventure films
American science fiction action films
American science fiction adventure films
American alternate history films
Remakes of American films
The Time Machine
Apocalyptic films
DreamWorks Pictures films
American dystopian films
Fictional-language films
Films about time travel
Films based on science fiction novels
Films based on works by H. G. Wells
Films directed by Simon Wells
Films postponed due to the September 11 attacks
Films set in 1899
Films set in 1903
Films set in 2030
Films set in 2037
Films set in the future
Films set in New York City
Films shot in California
Films shot in Los Angeles
Films shot in New York (state)
Holography in films
Films about impact events
Moon in film
Warner Bros. films
American post-apocalyptic films
Films with screenplays by John Logan
Films scored by Klaus Badelt
Films produced by Walter F. Parkes
Films produced by David Valdes
Science fiction novels adapted into films
2000s English-language films
2000s American films